Ismail Ahmed Kadar Hassan (born 23 May 1987) is a Djiboutian footballer who plays as a midfielder. He currently plays for RFC Tournai.

References

External links
 
 
 

1987 births
Footballers from Lille
Djiboutian footballers
Djibouti international footballers
French footballers
French people of Djiboutian descent
Algerian Ligue Professionnelle 1 players
ASO Chlef players
FC Petrolul Ploiești players
Association football midfielders
Djiboutian expatriate footballers
French expatriate footballers
Djiboutian expatriate sportspeople in Slovakia
Expatriate footballers in Slovakia
Djiboutian expatriate sportspeople in Algeria
French expatriate sportspeople in Algeria
Expatriate footballers in Algeria 
Djiboutian expatriate sportspeople in Romania
French expatriate sportspeople in Romania
Expatriate footballers in Romania
Living people
FC DAC 1904 Dunajská Streda players
Slovak Super Liga players
Djiboutian expatriate sportspeople in Bulgaria
Djiboutian expatriate sportspeople in Belgium
Djiboutian expatriate sportspeople in Tunisia
CS Avion players
CS Hammam-Lif players
French expatriate sportspeople in Tunisia
French expatriate sportspeople in Bulgaria
Expatriate footballers in Tunisia
Expatriate footballers in Bulgaria